Lalla Hirayama (born February 10, 1988) is a Japanese—South African television host, actress, dancer and model. Best known for her current work as one of 5 hosts of the live celebrity news show V Entertainment on DStv channel Vuzu as their longest serving host, a judge on South Africa's Got Talent and host of her show Lalla Land on M-net Movies channel.

Early life

Lalla Hirayama was born in Hiratsuka, Kanagawa Prefecture, Japan. She is the only child born to a Japanese mother and a white South African father of Jewish descent. In one interview she said she was brought up in the old school typical Japanese way “think Samurais and Zen”. Her father, although a white Jewish man, is a sangoma (shaman).

Hirayama has previously stated that she comes from a diverse background; Buddhism, Shinto, Judaism, Christianity and other belief systems and cultures. She spent her early years in Japan, then moved to Australia, and finally, at the age of about six to South Africa.

Hirayama started her primary schooling at Fairways Primary School in Sandton, Johannesburg in the Gauteng province of South Africa. While in primary school, she took part in horse riding and athletics and in 1997 became a Junior Horse Riding Champion.

In 2001, she returned to Japan where she taught hip-hop, tap and modern dancing in Kagoshima, Kagoshima Prefecture. She returned the next year to South Africa where she registered at the British International College (BIC) in Bryanston, Johannesburg in the Gauteng province of South Africa, for her high school education. While completing her high school education, Hirayama was involved in dance training.

In 2005, she began performing professionally, dancing at a number of corporate functions under the Vigor8 Company. A year later, in 2006, Hirayama founded the Clinch City Entertainment (ACC), a hip hop marketing & events company. In that year, she became part of the official dancers for renowned artists of that time, among others; the late Lebo Mathosa of Boom Shaka fame, and Tshwarelo ‘Relo’ Nhlapo; performed with Skwatta Kamp; and was featured in music videos of Unathi Msengana and Loyiso Bala.

Career

She first appeared on South African screens at the age of 15; as a presenter for the daily kids time channel Craz-e on E-TV.
After four years, Hirayama was head-hunted to SABC1 as a live continuity presenter and brand ambassador.
A year later she played the role of 'Felicia' on E-TV's prime time soapie Rhythm City and as a dark angel on the E-TV show Axe Dark Angels.
During this time she also began presenting the show 'Scar Tissue' for the new DSTV channel Vuzu, soon after which she joined the prime time, live celeb gossip show V Entertainment as well as becoming a live continuity presenter for the channel.
While on Vuzu, Hirayama played the role of 'Bianca' on the bio-weekly soapie 'Zone 14' on SABC1 and a few months later she joined the 'Tropica Island of Treasure' team and co-hosted the 3rd season, which aired on E-TV alongside DJ Fresh in Phuket, Thailand.
She co-hosted the reality hip-hop dance show 'Masters of Rhythm' on Vuzu from mid 2011.

In 2009 Hirayama was featured in the FHM calendar and voted #15 in FHM's 100 Sexiest Women In The World and #14 in 2010. She also featured in the yearly FHM Lingerie supplement in 2010 and is regularly featured in the magazine. She has won Glamour magazines ‘Most Glamorous’ award, ‘Best Innovative Style’ at the South African Style Awards and ‘Most Stylish’ at the G4 Sports awards.

Hirayama has an extremely strong professional dance background. She trained classically from the age of 4 in Ballet, Tap, Modern, Contemporary, Spanish and Jazz. She began teaching in Japan at the age of 14. Whilst in Japan she was exposed to the Hip-Hop scene and after returning to South Africa Hirayama co-founded South Africa's first mix style hip-hop dance crew "Clinch".

Filmography

References

1988 births
Living people
People from Hiratsuka, Kanagawa
Actresses from Kanagawa Prefecture
Models from Kanagawa Prefecture
South African actresses
South African female dancers
South African female models
Japanese emigrants to South Africa
South African people of Jewish descent
South African people of European descent
South African people of Japanese descent
Japanese people of South African descent
Japanese people of Jewish descent